Hatihe'u is a village in Nuku Hiva, in the Marquesas Islands. It lies on the bay of the same name and is also the name of an "amphitheater-shaped valley on the northeast side of the island". An ancient village in the area contains petroglyphs. Archaeologists have identified some 400 different features in the Hatihe'u Valley area.

References

Populated places in the Marquesas Islands
Archaeological sites in Oceania
Nuku Hiva